Zingiber montanum is a species of plant in the family Zingiberaceae, with no subspecies.  Native to Indo-China and Malesia, it has become an invasive species in the Caribbean and South America; there are many synonyms including Zingiber cassumunar.

Gallery

References

External links
 
 

montanum
Flora of Indo-China
Flora of Malesia